is a Pokémon species in Nintendo and Game Freak's Pokémon franchise. Created by Ken Sugimori, Gyarados first appeared in the video games Pokémon Red and Pokémon Blue and subsequent sequels, later appearing in various merchandise, spinoff titles and animated and printed adaptations of the franchise. Gyarados was voiced by Unshō Ishizuka in both Japanese and English media until Ishizuka died from esophageal cancer. Known as the Atrocious Pokémon, Gyarados is the evolved form of Magikarp, well-known for its fierce temper and reputation for causing nothing but destruction so much so that once it has worked itself into a frenzy, it will not calm down until everything around it has been destroyed.

Gyarados appears multiple times in the anime under various trainers such as Misty, Lance, Crasher Wake, and Nurse Joy. Two different Gyarados appear in the Pokémon Adventures manga. One is originally owned by Misty, but is traded between Red and Blue. The other is a red Gyarados owned by Silver. Since it appeared in the Pokémon series, Gyarados has received generally positive reception. It has been featured in several forms of merchandise, including figurines, plush toys, and the Pokémon Trading Card Game. Gyarados has been described as both one of the most well-known and most powerful Pokémon.

Design and characteristics
Gyarados was one of 151 different designs conceived by Game Freak's character development team and finalized by Ken Sugimori for the first generation of Pocket Monsters games Red and Green, which were localized outside Japan as Pokémon Red and Blue. Originally called "Gyarados" in Japanese, Nintendo decided to give the various Pokémon species "clever and descriptive names" related to their appearance or features when translating the game for western audiences as a means to make the characters more relatable to American children. As a result, the species' beta name was "Skulkraken", a combination of "skull" or "skulk" and "kraken", but in the final release the original Japanese name was used.

Gyarados is a Pokémon whose design is inspired by dragons, specifically dragons seen in Chinese mythology. The concept of Magikarp evolving into Gyarados is based on the ancient Chinese myth about carp that can evolve into flying dragons after leaping a waterfall. Its snakelike body is largely blue, but its underbelly is pale yellow. It has four white fins down its back, and a large and gaping mouth. Gyarados is known for its fierce temper and wanton destructive tendencies. Once it has worked itself into a frenzy, it will not calm until everything around it is destroyed, and can even go on for a whole month. This violent nature is attributed to the dramatic structural changes its brain undergoes during evolution. During times of human conflict Gyarados are said to appear, burning entire cities down to the ground. Gyarados usually live in large bodies of water, such as lakes and ponds or even seas and oceans.

Appearances

In video games

Gyarados first appears in the Pokémon video game series in Pokémon Red and Blue and later appears in every subsequent sequel. Gyarados is found uncommonly when fishing with a Super Rod, and evolves from Magikarp when gaining enough experience in battle. In Pokémon Gold, Silver and Crystal and their remakes, a red Gyarados is found in the Lake of Rage. The player has one chance to catch it (but in HeartGold and SoulSilver, it will come back after the player defeats the Elite Four) and the incident triggers the battle against Team Rocket in the Rocket Hideout in Mahogany Town. This Gyarados is mentioned at the beginning of Diamond and Pearl when the player sets out on their quest. Gyarados is used by many notable trainers such as Blue, Clair, Lance, Wallace, Pike Queen Lucy, Crasher Wake and Cyrus. Gyarados is one of several Pokémon to gain a Mega Evolution in Pokémon X and Y. When it Mega Evolves, it becomes a Water/Dark type and gains the ability Mold Breaker.

Gyarados makes many appearances outside of the main series, including appearances in Pokémon Snap, Pokémon Trading Card Game, Pokémon Mystery Dungeon: Blue Rescue Team and Red Rescue Team, Pokémon Ranger and Pokémon Go. In Pokémon Mystery Dungeon: Explorers of Time and Explorers of Darkness, a Gyarados appears in the Miracle Sea. He attempts to take control of Phione, but is halted by the player's team. In PokéPark Wii: Pikachu's Adventure, Gyarados tries to take over the Beach Zone in Empoleon's absence and is the host of a mini-game called "Aqua Dash". In Pokémon Go, Gyarados is generally considered one of the most difficult Pokémon to obtain - it must be evolved from a Magikarp (much like other Pokémon games) and requires 400 Magikarp candies to evolve, more than any other Pokémon in the game. In Pokkén Tournament and Pokkén Tournament DX, Gyarados has been shown in the Magikarp Festival as one of these arenas as only a background character, spectating a battle between the playable fighter Pokémon.

In the anime
Gyarados first appeared in Pokémon - I Choose You! swimming in a river. It was then seen in Pokémon Shipwreck, where James kicked his Magikarp out of frustration, and it evolved into a Gyarados and called the other Gyarados to unleash a Dragon Rage attack by forming a water spout. Misty owns a Gyarados. At first, she fearfully dislikes Gyarados due to a traumatic experience, but manages to get over the fear, take over the Cerulean City Gym, and add one to her team. It's revealed in the Sun and Moon anime that Misty can Mega Evolve her Gyarados. Talkin' 'Bout an Evolution and Rage Of Innocence focused on a red Gyarados. It was on a destructive rampage until Lance captured it. This Gyarados appeared again in Gaining Groudon and The Scuffle of Legends to stop the feuding of Groudon and Kyogre, and later reappeared in Pokemon Journeys: The Series. Gyarados has appeared many other times under the ownership of various trainers, such as Crasher Wake and Nurse Joy. In Coming Apart at the Dreams! a Shiny red Gyarados and its Mega Evolved form is under the ownership and usage by Team Flare Mastermind Lysandre. It is unknown what happened to it after Lysandre is engulfed in Zygarde's Core Enforcer attack in Forming a More Perfect Union!

In printed adaptations
In Pokémon Adventures, Gyarados debuts in the Red, Green & Blue chapter in Gyarados Splashes In!. Here, an enraged one attacks its own trainer, Misty, but is recaught by Red, who returns it to her. Later on, Misty traded this Gyarados to Red in exchange for Red's Krabby. When Red borrows Blue's Charizard to travel to Mt. Silver, he temporarily trades his Gyarados to Blue. It later appears as one of Blue's Pokémon in Volume 13, used against Entei, and later part of his revealed team during the Gym Leader faceoff. Prior to the FireRed and LeafGreen saga, Blue returns Gyarados to Red.

A red Gyarados was the leader of a group of Gyarados. When Team Rocket used the Goldenrod City Radio Tower to disturb Pokémon, these Gyarados went crazy. At the end, it was caught by Silver. After a battle with the Masked Man, this Gyarados was frozen and remained at the bottom of Lake of Rage until Lt. Surge discovered it. Gyarados was able to free himself and Lt. Surge returned it to Silver. Misty owns a Gyarados in the Electric Tale of Pikachu manga. It is used against Ash in their gym battle.

In film
Magikarp appears in Detective Pikachu when Pikachu throws Magikarp and immediately evolved into Gyarados as it battles with Charizard.

Reception
Since it appeared in the Pokémon series, Gyarados has received generally positive reception. Though GamesRadar described Magikarp as "[t]he ultimate in useless Pokémon", they described Gyarados as one of the "most well-known" characters in the series. They also featured it as their "Pokémon of the week". While discussing Shiny Pokémon, GamesRadar used Gyarados' shiny form as an example of a more dramatic change in appearance. They later called it "weird for being a Water/Flying type, but not being able to learn any flying moves at all (except for Bounce and Hurricane)". Wired John Mix Meyer described it as a "classic powerhouse", and GameSpy editor Justin Leeper called Gyarados a choice for "more macho gamers". IGN called it "one of the most powerful Pokémon ever encountered", comparing it to the image of Chinese mythological dragons. They also listed it as one of the "best flying type Pokémon", describing it as a "flying sea snake". Kevin Slackie of Paste listed Gyarados as 26th of the best Pokemon. Russ Frushtick of Polygon claimed that Gyarados is a worst first-gen Pokémon that should be wiped from existence, and further stated that "its amazing if there were no Gyarados. You’d find a Magikarp in the game and painstakingly level it up, assuming that, of course, it’ll be worth the effort". IGN readers voted Gyarados as tenth-best pocket monster, receiving 77.3% of win percentage. Steven Bogos of The Escapist listed Gyarados as fifth of their favorite Pokemon, describing Gyarados as one of the coolest designs in the Pokemon universe, and also one of the strongest monsters out there.

Author Ash Dekirk wrote that Gyarados and Magikarp were inspired by the Asiatic myth of the Dragon Gate. He adds that it is "scaled in sapphire" with "catfish barbels" on its "somewhat blunted snout". Author Loredane Lipperini similarly described Gyarados as resembling something from the Chinese New Year. IGN "Pokémon of the Day Chick" expressed dismay at Gyarados in Pokémon Crystal, commenting that while in its predecessors Pokémon Red, Blue, and Yellow, it was one of the "most valuable Pokémon", they ruined it by giving it very low special attack in this game. IGN described the growth from Pokémon Diamond and Pearl to Pokémon Black and White as possibly being the "series" biggest evolution since Magikarp morphed into Gyarados". IGN commented that a Pokémon game better than Black and White was Pokémon Snap, citing one of their "favorite experiences" as where the player can throw Pester Balls at a Magikarp to make it evolve into Gyarados and attack the player. Author Tracy West named Gyarados the "fourth best Water-type Pokémon". IGN readers voted Gyarados as the 11th best Pokémon. Editor Sam wrote, "This iconic Flying and Water Type Pokémon from the first generation of games epitomizes the trials and tribulations of training even the lamest of Pokémon." He says further, "Sure, everyone made fun of you as you toted around a Magikarp, but who’s laughing now -- Now that it’s evolved into a badass sea dragon Gyarados!" Official Nintendo Magazine writer Thomas East included it in his list of some of the coolest Pokémon. Elijah Watson of Complex described Gyarados as the best Pokemon, and stated that Gyarados is awesome for so many reasons. Andrew Webster of The Verge claimed Gyarados is a best Pokemon of all time.

Gyarados also has been featured in several forms of merchandise including figurines, plush toys, and the Pokémon Trading Card Game.

References

External links

 Gyarados on Bulbapedia
 Gyarados on Pokemon.com

Dragon characters in video games
Fictional characters who can manipulate darkness or shadows
Fictional undersea characters
Pokémon species
Video game characters introduced in 1996
Video game characters with air or wind abilities
Video game characters with water abilities
Video game bosses
Fictional dragons
Fictional monsters